The Globus Alliance is an international association founded by the University of Chicago and the Argonne National Laboratory dedicated to developing fundamental technologies needed to build grid computing infrastructures.  The Globus Alliance was officially established in September 2003, out of the Globus Project that was established in 1995.

A grid is a persistent environment that enables software applications to integrate instruments, displays, computational, and information resources that are managed by diverse organizations in widespread locations. Grids are currently in use at many research institutions and are being used to study subjects such as cosmology and high energy physics.

Toolkit
The Globus Alliance implements some of the standards developed at the Open Grid Forum (OGF) through the open source Globus Toolkit. As a grid middleware component, it provides a standard platform for services to build upon, but grid computing also needs other components, and other tools operate to support a grid environment.

Members 
 Argonne National Laboratory, University of Chicago (founder)
 EPCC, University of Edinburgh
 National Center for Supercomputing Applications (NCSA)
 Northern Illinois University, High Performance Computing Laboratory
 Royal Institute of Technology, Sweden
 Univa Corporation
 University of Southern California, Information Sciences Institute

See also
 Object Management Group

References

External links
 The Globus Alliance

Grid computing products
Organizations established in 2003